FC Turan is a professional football club from Kazakhstan based at the Turkistan Arena in Turkistan.

History 
On 12 January 2021, Turan were promoted to the Kazakhstan Premier League for the first time after the league increased its participants from 12 to 14 club.

Names
2002: Founded as Kostuin
2004: Renamed Arys
2021: Renamed Turan

League and cup record 

Key

Current squad

References

External links

 
Turan
Turan